Whitley is a suburb of the town of Reading, in the English county of Berkshire. It is also an electoral ward of the Borough of Reading.

Geography
Whitley, commonly known as one of the larger suburbs of Reading, is bounded to the north and east by a ridge of high ground carrying the road to Shinfield, to the west by the valleys of the River Kennet and the Foudry Brook, and to the south by an ill-defined boundary with the suburb of Whitley Wood. The former main road to Basingstoke passes just to the west of the centre of Whitley, dividing largely residential areas to its east from a largely industrial zone to its west. The current A33 relief road to Basingstoke passes to the west of the industrial area, as does the parallel railway line. Between the relief road and Bennet Road and railway can be found the recent Green Park business park and the Madejski Stadium.

History
Historically, Whitley was a hamlet outside the Reading borough limits, but within the parish of the church of St Giles in Reading.

Government
The Borough of Reading is responsible for all local government. Whitley is currently covered by parts of the Church, Katesgrove and Redlands wards, within the Reading East parliamentary constituency, and includes all of the Whitley electoral ward, within the Reading West parliamentary constituency. Whitley ward borders Coley, Katesgrove, Church and Southcote wards, together with parts of the local government district of Wokingham Borough. As with all wards, apart from smaller Mapledurham, it elects three councillors to Reading Borough Council.  Elections since 2004 are held by thirds, with elections in three years out of four. In the 2016, 2018 and 2019 a Labour Party candidate won each election.

Notable people
 Ricky Gervais, comedian, actor, film director and producer, musician and writer.
 Midge Ure, musician, whilst a member of Slik in 1974 lived briefly on Hexham Road.
 M. L. Emmett, poet, editor, and convenor of Friendly Street Poets Inc.
 Liam Bridcutt, footballer.

References

External links 
 

Suburbs of Reading, Berkshire
Wards of Reading